Entrance is the first studio album by Edgar Winter, brother of guitarist Johnny Winter who featured on one track, "Tobacco Road".

Track listing

Personnel
Edgar Winter - vocals, organ, alto saxophone, piano, celeste
Randal Dollahon - guitar
Gene Kurtz - bass
Jimmy Gillen - drums
Ray Alonge, Earl Chapin, Brooks Tillotson - horns
Paul Gershman, Emanuel Green, Gene Cahn, Ralph Oxman, Russ Savakus - strings
Johnny Winter - guitar, harmonica, vocals on "Tobacco Road"
Tommy Shannon - bass on "Tobacco Road"
"Uncle" John Turner - drums on "Tobacco Road"
Technical
Roy Segal, Stu Romain - engineer
Steve Paul - organic director
Richard Mantel - cover design
Shepard Sherbell - photography

References

1970 debut albums
Edgar Winter albums
Epic Records albums